The 1897 South Australian Football Association season was the 21st edition of the top level of Australian rules football to be played in South Australia. Port Adelaide won its 3rd premiership.

This was the first season of football in South Australia where behinds contributed to the total score, not just goals.

In winning the 1897 SAFA premiership, Port Adelaide achieved the rare feat of going from last the previous year to first.

Natives informed the SAFA at a meeting on Monday 26 Oct 1896 that they were changing their name to West Torrens.

West Adelaide Football Club joined the SAFA after their application was approved by 6 votes to 4 against at a meeting held on 5 April 1897.

Ladder 

1 The Round 19 match between West Torrens and West Adelaide at Kensington Oval was abandoned as a draw at quarter time after torrential rain flooded the ground (scores at the time were West Torrens 1 goal 1 behind to West Adelaide 1 goal).

References 

SANFL
South Australian National Football League seasons